Tony Beaver is a character in several tall tales, often in tandem with stories of Paul Bunyan. Beaver was a West Virginian woodsman located up Eel River, often described as a cousin of Paul Bunyan, and champion griddle skater of the Southern United States. The stories appeared in print in the early 20th century and were later compiled by Mary E. Cober.

"Tony Beaver" is also the title of a folk operetta by Max Berton (lyrics and libretto) and  Josef Marais (music), published in 1954 by G. Schirmer. As the introduction to the libretto  puts it: "When you have met Tony Beaver, you may say, 'The things that happen to Tony can never happen to me,' and no doubt you will be right. For in your workaday world, the melons you plant can turn out to be no more than melon-sized, while in Tony's realm, melons may grow as big as moons. For Tony has all the resources of folklore at his command, its ingenuity, its wonder, and he walks hand in hand with fabulous kinsmen...inhabitants of a realm where the unbelievable is believable, where the fantastic is commonplace, where the dreams and the doings are scaled to tall measure....  Perhaps you cannot hope to match Tony's doings, but you can match his dream."  The musical play "Tony Beaver" was first performed at the Idyllwild School of Music and the Arts, Idyllwild, CA, in 1955.

References

External links
Tony Beaver, griddle skater. via Open Library

West Virginia culture
American folklore
Tall tales
Paul Bunyan